Greig Hutcheon (born 20 March 1973) is a Scottish professional golfer. He had three victories on the Challenge Tour between 1999 and 2003. He has won both the Scottish PGA Championship and the Northern Open three times. Hutcheon has won the "Tartan Tour" Order of Merit seven times.

Professional wins (12)

Challenge Tour wins (3)

Challenge Tour playoff record (1–0)

Other wins (9)
1999 Scottish PGA Championship
2010 Srixon PGA Play-offs, Northern Open
2013 PGA Play-offs, Scottish PGA Championship
2016 Northern Open
2018 Scottish PGA Championship
2022 PGA Play-offs, Northern Open

Team appearances
PGA Cup (representing Great Britain and Ireland): 2013, 2017 (winners), 2022

References

External links

Scottish male golfers
European Tour golfers
Sportspeople from Aberdeen
1973 births
Living people